Dimitar Zakonov (Bulgarian: Димитър Законов; born 20 June 1999) is a Bulgarian footballer who plays as a midfielder.

Career

Lokomotiv Plovdiv
On 31 May 2017, Zakonov made his debut for Lokomotiv Plovdiv in a match against Ludogorets Razgrad.

Career statistics

Club

References

External links
 

1999 births
Living people
Bulgarian footballers
PFC Lokomotiv Plovdiv players
FC Arda Kardzhali players
FC Pomorie players
FC Hebar Pazardzhik players
First Professional Football League (Bulgaria) players
Association football midfielders